The 2004 Volta a Catalunya was the 84th edition of the Volta a Catalunya cycle race and was held from 14 June to 20 June 2004. The race started in Salou and finished in Barcelona. The race was won by Miguel Ángel Martín Perdiguero of the Saunier Duval–Prodir team.

Teams
Fifteen teams of up to eight riders started the race:

 
 
 
 
 
 
 
 
 
 
 
 
 Cafés Baqué

Route

Stages

Stage 1
14 June 2004 – Salou to Salou,  (TTT)

Stage 2
15 June 2004 – Salou to Horta de Sant Joan,

Stage 3
16 June 2004 – Les Borges Blanques to Col de Pal,

Stage 4
17 June 2004 – Llorts to Ordino-Arcalis,

Stage 5
18 June 2004 – Llívia to Blanes,

Stage 6
19 June 2004 – Blanes to Vallirana,

Stage 7
20 June 2004 – Olesa de Montserrat to Barcelona,

General classification

References

2004
Volta
2004 in Spanish road cycling
June 2004 sports events in Europe